Michael Damgaard Nielsen (born 18 March 1990) is a Danish handball player for SC Magdeburg and the Danish national team.

He has previously played for Danish sides GOG and Team Tvis Holstebro.

He is the younger brother of Allan Damgaard Espersen.

Honours
Handball-Bundesliga:
: 2022
German Cup
: 2016
EHF Cup/EHF European League:
: 2021
: 2022
: 2013, 2017, 2018
IHF Super Globe:
: 2021, 2022
Danish Championship:
: 2014
Summer Olympics:
: 2016

References

External links

Profile at club website

Danish male handball players
Living people
1990 births
Handball-Bundesliga players
Expatriate handball players
Danish expatriate sportspeople in Germany
Olympic handball players of Denmark
Handball players at the 2016 Summer Olympics
Medalists at the 2016 Summer Olympics
Olympic gold medalists for Denmark
Olympic medalists in handball
TTH Holstebro players
SC Magdeburg players